The 2006 Sioux Falls Cougars football team represented the University of Sioux Falls in the 2006 NAIA football season. The Cougars won the 2006 NAIA Football National Championship with a 23–19 victory over the top-ranked St. Francis Cougars. The team also won the Great Plains Athletic Conference championship with a perfect 10–0 record. This was the school's second NAIA Championship (1996). The team was coached by Kalen DeBoer.

Schedule

References

Sioux Falls
Sioux Falls Cougars football seasons
NAIA Football National Champions
College football undefeated seasons
 Sioux Falls Cougars football